Macrocheles opacus is a species of mite in the family Macrochelidae.

References

opacus
Articles created by Qbugbot
Animals described in 1839